Selfhaters is an album by keyboardist Anthony Coleman which was released on the Tzadik label in 1996.

Reception

In her review for Allmusic, Joslyn Layne notes that "Generally sounding more like a drunken choir, this instrumental group gets almost bluesy in a klezmer/avant-jazz kind of way. Coleman fans will dig it, as he has some fine organ moments throughout. The selections are, overall, more scattered, like threads tied at one end to a musical idea that are dispersed and floating in all directions, swirling around Coleman's playing".

Track listing
All compositions by Anthony Coleman except as indicated
 "Hidden Language" (Anthony Coleman, The Selfhaters) - 3:37   
 "Bim" - 4:29   
 "Eurotrash Ballade" (The Selfhaters) - 5:34   
 "You Don't Know What Love Is" (Gene de Paul, Don Raye) - 5:02   
 "The Dream Factory" - 11:01   
 "The Mooche" (Duke Ellington, Irving Mills) - 4:34   
 "Bom" (The Selfhaters) - 6:30   
 "Goodbye and Good Luck" - 13:01

Personnel
Anthony Coleman - piano, organ, trombone, accordion, sampler, voice 
Doug Wieselman - clarinet (tracks 1-5, 7 & 8) 
David Krakauer - bass clarinet (track 8)
Michael Attias - clarinet, alto saxophone, baritone saxophone (tracks 3-6) 
Fred Lonberg-Holm - cello, banjo (tracks 3-6)
Jim Pugliese - percussion

References

Tzadik Records albums
Anthony Coleman albums
1996 albums
Albums recorded at the Knitting Factory